VC CSKA Moscow was a Russian volleyball club. They played in the Russian Super League, winning the competition three times. The club is the most titled volleyball team in the Soviet Union / Russia and in Europe with 13 CEV Champions Leagues. In 2009, VC CSKA Moscow was disbanded due to financial problems.

Team honours

Domestic competitions 
Soviet Championship:
Winners (33) (record):  1949, 1950, 1952, 1953, 1954, 1955, 1958, 1960, 1961, 1962, 1965, 1966, 1970–1983, 1985–1991

Soviet Cup
Winners (5) (record):  1953, 1980, 1982, 1984, 1985

Russian Super League 
Winners (3):  1994, 1995, 1996
Runners-up (1):  1993
Third place (2):  1997, 1998

Russian Cup
Winners (1):  1994
Third place (1):  1997

European competitions 
  CEV Champions League
Winners (13) (record):  1960, 1962, 1973, 1974, 1975, 1977, 1982, 1983, 1986, 1987, 1988, 1989, 1991
Runners-up (3):  1961, 1963, 1981
Third place (2):  1992

  CEV European Super Cup 
Winners (3):  1987, 1988, 1991
Runners-up (1):  1989

Worldwide competitions
 FIVB Club World Championship
Runners-up (1):  1989

Notable players
Konstantin Reva (1921–1997), World and Europe champion
Yuri Chesnokov (1933–2010), Volleyball Hall of Fame Member
Georgi Mondzolevski (born 1934), Olympic and World champion, Volleyball Hall of Fame Member
Aleksandr Savin (born 1957), Olympic champion, Volleyball Hall of Fame member

External links
Official website

Russian volleyball clubs
VC
Volleyball clubs established in 1946
Volleyball clubs disestablished in 2009
1946 establishments in Russia
2009 disestablishments in Russia